The 2008 America East men's basketball tournament was held from March 7–9 at the Binghamton University Events Center. The final was held March 15 at the Retriever Activities Center. As winners, the UMBC Retrievers win an automatic berth to the 2008 NCAA Men's Division I Basketball Tournament for the first time in their 22-year Division I history, with their win over Hartford. UMBC was given the 15th seed in the Midwest Regional of the NCAA Tournament and lost in the first round to Georgetown 66–47.

Bracket and Results

* Game Ended in Overtime

See also
America East Conference

References

America East Conference men's basketball tournament
2007–08 America East Conference men's basketball season